A Guide to the Business Analysis Body of Knowledge (BABOK) is a guide about business analysis, issued by the International Institute of Business Analysis (IIBA), attempting to reflect current best practice and to provide a framework that describes the areas of knowledge, with associated activities and tasks and techniques required, from the International Institute of Business Analysis.

According to Capability Maturity Model Integration, organisations interested in process improvement should adopt industry standards from the Business Analysis Body of Knowledge (and other associated references) to lift their project delivery from the ad hoc to the managed level.

History 
The BABOK was first published by the International Institute of Business Analysis (IIBA) as a draft document version 1.4, in October 2005, for consultation with the wider business analysis and project management community, to document and standardise generally accepted business analysis practices. The first formal release was at version 1.6 in June 2006. Version 2.0 was released in 2009. Version 3.0 was released in 2015.

See also
 International Institute of Business Analysis

References

External links 
 A Guide to the Business Analysis Body of Knowledge (Babok Guide) Version 3.0

2005 works
Business process
Project management
Systems analysis
Business analysis
Bodies of knowledge